Robert Frederic Heffner (born September 13, 1938), nicknamed "Butch", was a Major League Baseball right-handed pitcher with the Boston Red Sox (–), Cleveland Indians, and California Angels.

Early life and education
Heffner was born in Allentown, Pennsylvania. He attended and graduated from Allentown High School in 1957.

Major League Baseball
On June 12, 1957, Heffner was signed by the Boston Red Sox as an amateur free agent right out of high school.

Throughout his Major League Baseball (MLB) career, Heffner was used both as starter and reliever.

Hefner's five-season MLB career totals include an 11–21 W–L record, a 4.51 ERA, and six saves. Overall, he appeared in 114 games, 31 of which were as a starter.

External links

Bob Heffner at SABR (Baseball BioProject)
Bob Heffner at Baseball Almanac
Bob Heffner at Baseball Library

1938 births
Living people
Allentown Red Sox players
Baseball players from Pennsylvania
Boston Red Sox players
California Angels players
Cleveland Indians players
Corning Red Sox players
Johnstown Red Sox players
Major League Baseball pitchers
Parade High School All-Americans (boys' basketball)
Sportspeople from Allentown, Pennsylvania
Portland Beavers players
Seattle Angels players
Seattle Rainiers players
Toronto Maple Leafs (International League) players
York White Roses players
William Allen High School alumni